Minnie's Bow-Toons is an American computer-animated preschool television series from Disney Television Animation. The series aired from November 14, 2011 to January 22, 2016, on Disney Junior, as a short-form series targeted at preschool girls as well as the spin-off from Mickey Mouse Clubhouse. The series was based on the Mickey Mouse Clubhouse episode "Minnie's Bow-tique". In both the episode and its spin-off, Minnie opens the same boutique from the former - this time with bows and bow-ties.

Minnie's Bow-Toons introduced Cuckoo-Loca as well as Minnie's twin nieces, Millie and Melody Mouse (starting with the episode "Trouble Times Two").

Minnie's Bow-Toons was followed by a revival of the series, entitled Minnie's Bow-Toons: Party Palace Pals, which was released on April 3, 2021 on Disney Junior's YouTube channel and later aired its first episode on April 5 on Disney Junior (this time in the style of Mickey Mouse Mixed-Up Adventures).

Premise 
After the events of the Mickey Mouse Clubhouse episode "Minnie's Bow-tique", this TV series is about the adventures of Minnie Mouse and her friend Daisy Duck as they run Minnie's Bow-tique, a specialty shop stocked only with colorful bows and bowties. Minnie ends all the Season 1 episodes saying, "There's no business like bow business!" In Season 3, Minnie, Daisy and Cuckoo Loca open a pet grooming salon adjacent to the Bow-tique. In Season 4, Minnie, Daisy and Cuckoo Loca go on international trips, visiting cities like London, Venice, and Tokyo. In  Season 6, Minnie, Daisy and Cuckoo Loca start a new party planning business.

Voice cast

Main 
 Russi Taylor (original) and Kaitlyn Robrock (Party Palace Pals!) as Minnie Mouse and Bow-Bot
 Tress MacNeille as Daisy Duck, Chip, Penelope Poodle, Animal Trainer, Mrs. Porkins, and the Queen of the United Kingdom
 Nika Futterman as Cuckoo Loca, Paparazzi Reporter, and Baby Oinky

Recurring 
 April Winchell as Clarabelle Cow
 Frank Welker as Figaro, Gilbert, Pizza Restaurant Diner #2
 Avalon Robbins as Millie and Melody Mouse
 Bret Iwan as Mickey Mouse
 Tony Anselmo as Donald Duck
 Bill Farmer as Goofy, Pluto, Penguini the Magnificent, Singing Ghosts, Delivery Men, Hot Dog Vendor at the Pet Adoption, Luigi the Pizza Shop Owner, Kabuki Theater Manager, and TV Announcer
 Corey Burton as Ludwig von Drake, Dale
 Max Charles as Joey Beaver
 Ariel Winter as Roxie Squirrel
 Carlos Alazraqui as Panchito Pistoles
 Grace Kaufman as Chloe Bunny, Posey Bear, and Emmy Mouse

Episodes

Series overview

Season 1 (2011–12)

Season 2 (2012–13)

Season 3 (2013–14)

Season 4 (2014–15)

Season 5 (2016)

Season 6: Party Palace Pals! - Season 1 (2021–22)

Season 7: Party Palace Pals! - Season 2 (2022)

Awards and nominations

Video games 
Minnie's Bow-Maker
Minnie's Bow-Toons Dress Up
Minnie's Flutterin' Butterfly Bow
Minnie's Masquerade Match Up
Minnie's Skating Symphony
Minnie-Rella's Magical Journey
Minnie's Bow Bubble Trouble

See also 
List of Mickey Mouse Clubhouse episodes
Mickey Mouse Funhouse

:simple:Minnie’s Bow-Toons
List of Baby Einstein videos

References

External links 
 

2011 American television series debuts
2010s American animated television series
2020s American animated television series
American children's animated comedy television series
American television series revived after cancellation
Disney Channel original programming
Yeti in fiction
Television series by Disney Television Animation
American preschool education television series
Animated preschool education television series
2010s preschool education television series
2020s preschool education television series
Mickey Mouse television series
Donald Duck television series
American animated television spin-offs
American computer-animated television series
Disney Junior original programming
English-language television shows